Docolamia is a beetle genus in the family Cerambycidae described by Stephan von Breuning in 1944. Its single species, Docolamia incisa, was described by Per Olof Christopher Aurivillius in 1916.

References

Lamiini
Beetles described in 1916
Monotypic Cerambycidae genera